In Greek mythology, Liriope or Leiriope is a Boeotian naiad of Thespiae, who was probably the daughter of one of the Boeotian or Phocian river gods. Liriope was raped by the river-god Cephissus, who was himself the son of Pontus and Thalassa, and bore his son Narcissus.

Liriope's name means "face of the narcissus" from the Greek words leirion "narcissus" and ops "face." Her son was also named for the flower—narkissos in Greek. Leiron and narkissos might be the same plant or could represent two different species of daffodil.

Liriope was probably identified with Lilaia, the Naiad-nymph of the springs of the river Kephisos.

References

Nymphs
Mythological rape victims
Boeotian characters in Greek mythology